Spin ( - literally The Shadow Men) is a French political television drama series created by Dan Franck, Frederic Tellier, Charline de Lépine and Emmanuel Daucé, and broadcast from 25 January 2012 on France 2.

After the success of the first season in its native France, a second season was commissioned, which premièred on France 2 on 1 October 2014 with 13.5% of the viewing audience. While prime time viewing figures were disappointing, combining those with on-demand numbers led to a more stable audience. A third series was subsequently commissioned. It was broadcast in France in October–November 2016.

In December 2015 it was announced that Spin would air in the UK on More4. The show premiered on 8 January 2016 and the two existing seasons were broadcast consecutively on a weekly basis. The third and final season was broadcast in April–May 2017.

Synopsis

Season 1 
The President of France, visiting a striking factory in Saint-Étienne in the Loire, east-central France, is killed in a suicide attack. Presidential elections are announced for 35 days later and there is no doubt that the prime minister, Philip Deleuvre, will run for the Élysée. But what few people know is that the Prime Minister knows more than he claims. This grand lie causes a return to business of Simon Kapita (Bruno Wolkowitch), a former spin doctor to the late president. Anxious to preserve the honour of his dead friend and some form of political ethics, this "man of the shadows" sets out to find a candidate who will be able to beat Deleuvre — who is being advised by Kapita's former protégé Ludovic Desmeuze.

Cast 

1 In series 1, Valérie Karsenti portrayed Apolline.

Episodes

Season 1 (2012)

Season 2 (2014)

Season 3 (2016)

International broadcasts

Recognition

References

External links 
  (French)
 

French-language television shows
2012 French television series debuts
Television shows set in France
France Télévisions television dramas
French political drama television series
Television shows set in Paris